Hope is an attitude which combines desire with expectation.

Hope or HOPE may also refer to:

Theology and mythology
 Hope (virtue), one of the three theological virtues in Christian tradition
 Elpis (mythology), the Greek goddess of hope

Places

Canada
 Hope, British Columbia
 Hope Mountain, British Columbia
 Hope, Ontario
 Hope, Quebec
 Hope Town, Quebec

United Kingdom
 Hope, Derbyshire, England
 Hope, Flintshire, Wales

United States
 Hope, Alaska
 Hope, Arizona
 Hope, Arkansas, the birthplace of former US president Bill Clinton
 Hope, Idaho
 Hope, Illinois
 Hope, Indiana
 Hope, Kansas
 Hope, Kentucky
 Hope, Maine
 Hope, Michigan
 Hope, Missouri
 Hope, New Mexico
 Hope, New York
 Hope, North Dakota
 Hope, Ohio
 Hope, Providence, Rhode Island, a neighborhood
 Hope, Dane County, Wisconsin
 Hope, U.S. Virgin Islands, a settlement

Other places
 Hope Crater, Mars; see List of craters on Mars: H–N
 Hope Bay, Trinity Peninsula, Antarctica
 Hope Harbour, Falkland Islands
 Cape Hope, Greenland
 Hope Bay, Jamaica
 Hope, New Zealand
 Hope Valley (disambiguation)
 Hope Island (disambiguation)
 Hope River (disambiguation)
 Hope Township (disambiguation)

People
 Hope (given name), a given name
 Hope (surname), a surname

Arts, entertainment and media

Literature
 Hope (Clapham novel), a 2002 novel based on the TV series Dr Who
 Hope (Deighton novel), a 1995 novel in the Faith, Hope, and Charity trilogy by Len Deighton
 Hope!!, a chapter of the Japanese manga comic One Piece

Film
 Hope (1922 film), a film starring Mary Astor
 Hope (1997 film), a TV film starring Jena Malone
 Hope (2006 film), a Telugu film directed by Satish Kasetty
 Hope (2011 film), a Canadian film
 Hope (2013 film), a South Korean film
 Hope (2014 film), a French film
 Hope (2019 film), a Norwegian film

Fictional characters
 Hope Summers (character), in the Marvel Comics universe
 Hope (Xena), in the TV series Xena: Warrior Princess
 Hope Bauer, in the American soap opera Guiding Light
 Hope Williams Brady, in the American soap opera Days of Our Lives

Music
 Hope Recordings, a UK record label

Groups
 Hope (American band), a 1969–1972 Christian rock group
 Hope (English band), a 2007–2009 girl group, finalists in series 4 of The X Factor

Albums
 Hope (The Blackout album) or the title song, 2011
 Hope (Harem Scarem album) or the title song, 2008
 Hope (Hillsong album), 2003
 Hope (Hugh Masekela album), 1994
 Hope (Klaatu album) or the title song, 1977
 Hope (Manchester Orchestra album), 2014
 Hope (Meg Mac album) or the title song, 2019
 Hope (Non-Prophets album), 2003
 Hope (Shamir album) or the title song, 2017
 Hope (Silent Border album) or the title song, 2007
 Hope (Susan Boyle album), 2014
 Hope (Swallow the Sun album) or the title song, 2007
 Hope (Toshiko Akiyoshi album) or the title song (see below), 2006
 Hope (War Child album), a compilation produced by the UK charity, 2003
 Hope, by Betty Buckley, 2018
 Hope, by iamnot, 2017
 Hope, by Michael English, 1993
 Hope, by Sigma, or the title song, 2022
 Hope, by the Strumbellas, 2016
 Hope, by Third Party, 2017

EPs
 Hope (Hawthorne Heights EP) or the title song, 2012
 Hope (Palace Songs EP), 1994
 Hope, by Dream On, Dreamer, 2010

Songs
 "Hope" (The Chainsmokers song), 2018
 "Hope" (David Campbell song), 2003
 "Hope" (Jack Johnson song), 2008
 "Hope" (NF song), 2023
 "Hope" (Our Lady Peace song), 1994
 "Hope" (Stefan song), 2021
 "Hope" (Toshiko Akiyoshi song), 2006
 "Hope" (Twista song), 2004
 "Hope" (XXXTentacion song), 2018
 "Hope" (instrumental), by Rush, 2007
 "Hatikvah" ("The Hope"), the national anthem of Israel
 "Onara" (song), or "Hope", the theme song for the Korean television series Dae Jang Geum, 2003
 "Hope", by Alien Ant Farm from Truant, 2003
 "Hope", by Apocalyptica from Cult, 2000
 "Hope", by Avail from Satiate, 1992
 "Hope", by Björk from Volta, 2007
 "Hope", by Boris from Attention Please, 2011
 "Hope", by Descendents from Milo Goes to College, 1982
 "Hope", by Fat Freddy's Drop from Based on a True Story, 2005
 "Hope", by Gaëtan Roussel from Trafic, 2018
 "Hope", by Golden Earring from Seven Tears, 1971
 "Hope", by Nas from Hip Hop Is Dead, 2006
 "Hope", by R.E.M. from Up, 1998
 "Hope", by Sevendust from Chapter VII: Hope & Sorrow, 2008
 "Hope", by Shaggy from Hot Shot, 2000
 "Hope", by Strapping Young Lad from The New Black, 2006
 "Hope", by Take That from Wonderland, 2017
 "Hope", by the Weather Girls from Success, 1983
 "Hope", by We Came As Romans from Tracing Back Roots, 2013
 "Hope", from the musical Zorro, 2008

Visual art
 Hope (Burne-Jones), an 1896 painting by Edward Burne-Jones
 Hope (Pollaiuolo), a 1470 painting by Piero del Pollaiuolo
 Hope (Watts), an 1886 painting by George Frederic Watts
 Hope I, a 1903 painting by Gustav Klimt
 Hope II, a 1907–1908 painting by Gustav Klimt
 Barack Obama "Hope" poster, a 2008 image designed by Shepard Fairey

Other arts and media
 Hope Channel, an international Seventh-day Adventist TV network
 Hope! – Das Obama Musical, a German musical based on the life of US president Barack Obama
 Hope Theatre, an English Renaissance theatre built in London in 1614

Computing and science
 Hope (programming language), a small functional programming language
 Hackers on Planet Earth, a biennial conference series sponsored by the magazine 2600: The Hacker Quarterly
 Hamburg Ocean Primitive Equation General Circulation Model, one of the ocean circulation models

Education
 Hope College, Holland, Michigan, US
 Hope High School (disambiguation)
 Hope International University, Fullerton, California, US
 HOPE Scholarship, a university scholarship program in Georgia, US
 Liverpool Hope University, Liverpool, England, United Kingdom

Law and government
 Hope (political party), in Slovakia
 Hawaii's Opportunity Probation with Enforcement
 Lespwa (Haitian Creole for Hope), a Haitian political coalition

Medicine and charity 
 Health Oriented Preventive Education (HOPE), a Pakistan NGO which provides the poor with health and education services

Transportation

Ships
 Hope (ship), several vessels
 HMS Hope, several ships of the Royal Navy
 SS Hope, an American hospital ship
 USS Hope, several ships of the US Navy

Space flight
 HOPE-X, a cancelled Japanese experimental spaceplane
 Hope Mars Mission, a space exploration probe by the United Arab Emirates launched in 2020
 Human Outer Planet Exploration, a 2003 NASA study that focused on Jupiter's moon Callisto

Other transportation
 Hope Motor Company, a Japanese car company
 Hope Aerodrome, Canada
 Hope railway station (disambiguation)

Other uses
 Hope (Gardner, Louisiana), an historic house in the US
 Hope (dolphin), a dolphin and subject of the 2014 movie Dolphin Tale 2
 Hope Diamond
 Hope Lodge (disambiguation)
 Hope (cigarette), a Japanese brand of cigarette

See also
 Hopa, a city in northeast Turkey
 Hope Bowdler, a village and civil parish in Shropshire, England
 Hope Bagot, a hamlet and civil parish in Shropshire, England
 
 De Hoop (disambiguation) (English: The Hope)
 Hopeful (disambiguation)
 Hopeless (disambiguation)
 Hopetoun (disambiguation)
 Lespwa (Haitian Creole for Hope), a Haitian political coalition
 The Hope (disambiguation)